Sazhdenik is a village in Kyustendil Municipality, Kyustendil Province, south-western Bulgaria. Located is at southern slopes at Osogowska mountain.

References

Villages in Kyustendil Province